Kathrin Längert (born 4 June 1987) is a German former footballer who played as a goalkeeper.

Career
Längert played in Germany for FCR 2001 Duisburg and Bayern Munich until May 2014, when she signed with FC Rosengård to play in the Swedish Damallsvenskan.

On 11 January 2016, almost two years since her move to Sweden, she returned to the Frauen-Bundesliga signing with FF USV Jena.

References

External links 
 
 
 Profile at DFB
 
 

1987 births
Living people
Footballers from Essen
German women's footballers
Women's association football goalkeepers
Germany women's youth international footballers
Frauen-Bundesliga players
Damallsvenskan players
SGS Essen players
FCR 2001 Duisburg players
FC Bayern Munich (women) players
FC Rosengård players
German expatriate footballers
German expatriate sportspeople in Sweden
Expatriate women's footballers in Sweden